Bianca Castanho Pereira (born January 25, 1979 in Santa Maria, Rio Grande do Sul) is a Brazilian actress.

Filmography

Telenovelas
2014 Milagres de Jesus - Zima
2013 Dona Xepa - Beatriz Sampaio
2012 Rei Davi - Selima
2009 Promessas de Amor - Arminda
2007 Amor e Intrigas - Antônia Fraga
2006 Cristal - Cristina da Silva de Jesus (Cristal)
2004 Esmeralda - Esmeralda Álvares Real
2003 Canavial de Paixões - Clara Feberman Santos
2002 O Beijo do Vampiro - Clarissa Silva (Ciça)
2001 Malhação - Valéria Oliveira
2001 A Turma do Didi - Juli Santana/Azazel
2000 Uga-Uga - Ametista
1999 Terra Nostra - Florinda
1998 Você Decide - Ana Sampaio
1998 Ensino Geral - Presenter

Film
 A Partilha - Esposa de Carlos (Carlos's wife)

References

1979 births
Brazilian television actresses
Brazilian telenovela actresses
Living people
People from Santa Maria, Rio Grande do Sul